Wayde Preston (born William Erksine Strange; September 10, 1929 – February 6, 1992) was an American actor cast from 1957 to 1960 in the lead role in 67 episodes of the ABC/Warner Bros. Western television series, Colt .45.

Background

Born William Erksine Strange in Steamboat Springs, Colorado, Preston was reared in Laramie in southern Wyoming by his educator parents, John and Bernice Strange. He had two younger sisters, Joan and Mary. In 1947, he graduated from Laramie High School, where he was active in football, track,  band, and the Reserve Officer Training Corps. He attended the University of Wyoming in Laramie, where he studied pharmacy. 

Preston was a park ranger and performed musically on the rodeo circuit before he got his break as an actor.

Acting career

In Colt .45 he played Christopher Colt, a government undercover agent who masquerades as a pistol salesman traveling throughout the Old West. Preston also played the role of Christopher Colt in 1958 and 1959 in four episodes relating to "The Canary Kid" of the ABC/WB Sugarfoot series.

Preston appeared in "The Saga of Waco Williams" on Maverick. The episode drew the highest viewership of the series.

Preston played some 20 roles in television and films from 1957 to 1991. Following his departure from Colt .45, he went to Europe, where he appeared in numerous Spaghetti Westerns, including A Man Called Sledge and the 1968 film Anzio, about the World War II Battle of Anzio. Preston played Logan in another 1968 film, Wrath of God; he was then cast in 1969 as Marshal Johnny Silver in Death Knows No Time.

Preston later appeared on episodes of NBC's Bonanza and ABC's Starsky and Hutch. His last screen appearance was in a supporting role in the 1990 film version of Captain America.

Personal life 
In 1956, Preston married actress Carol Ohmart. They divorced in 1958. Preston died of cancer on February 6, 1992, at age 62 in Lovelock, Nevada.

Filmography

References

External links 
 
 

1929 births
1992 deaths
20th-century American male actors
20th-century American musicians
American male film actors
American male television actors
Male actors from Denver
People from Laramie, Wyoming
Male actors from Los Angeles
People from Lovelock, Nevada
Male actors from Wyoming
Laramie High School (Wyoming) alumni
University of Wyoming alumni
United States Army personnel of the Korean War
United States Army officers
Deaths from colorectal cancer
Deaths from cancer in Nevada
Warner Bros. contract players
Western (genre) television actors
Non-traditional rodeo performers
20th-century American male musicians